Francis Duteil (25 March 1947 – 9 October 2016) was a French cyclist. He competed in the individual road race event at the 1976 Summer Olympics. Duteil won the 1970 Tour du Limousin.

References

External links
 

1947 births
2016 deaths
French male cyclists
Olympic cyclists of France
Cyclists at the 1976 Summer Olympics
People from Angoulême
Sportspeople from Charente
Cyclists from Nouvelle-Aquitaine